Garabaghlar or Karabaghlar may refer to:
Karabağlar, Turkey
Qarabağlar, Goychay, Azerbaijan
Qarabağlar, Kangarli, Nakhchivan, Azerbaijan
Qarabağlar, Samukh, Azerbaijan
Qarabağlar, Shamkir, Azerbaijan

See also
Qarabağlı (disambiguation)